Big Mountain Air Force Station  is a military use airstrip located near Big Mountain, in the Lake and Peninsula Borough of the U.S. state of Alaska.

History 
Big Mountain RRS was constructed in 1956 as part of the White Alice Communication System (WACS), a defense communication network and aircraft warning system established across Alaska during the Cold War. Advances in technology made the Big Mountain installation obsolete and it was abandoned in 1979. The United States Air Force still owns  at the site, which consists of a Lower Camp alongside the airstrip and an Upper Camp on the top of Big Mountain. There is also a barge landing site at Reindeer Bay that is now owned by the University of Alaska, with surrounding land owned by the State of Alaska.

Facilities 
Big Mountain has one runway designated 7/25 with a 4,200 by 145 ft (1,280 x 44 m) gravel surface.

References

External links 
 
 
 

Installations of the United States Air Force in Alaska
Airports in Lake and Peninsula Borough, Alaska